Fredrik Kuoppa (born 16 August 1971) is a Swedish biathlete. He competed in the men's 20 km individual event at the 1998 Winter Olympics.

References

External links
 

1971 births
Living people
Swedish male biathletes
Olympic biathletes of Sweden
Biathletes at the 1998 Winter Olympics
People from Sundsvall
20th-century Swedish people